Guibert de Nogent (c. 1055 – 1124) was a Benedictine historian, theologian and author of autobiographical memoirs. Guibert was relatively unknown in his own time, going virtually unmentioned by his contemporaries. He has only recently caught the attention of scholars who have been more interested in his extensive autobiographical memoirs and personality which provide insight into medieval life.

Life
Guibert was born of parents from the minor nobility at Clermont-en-Beauvaisis. Guibert claims that it took his parents over seven years to conceive, as he writes in his Monodiae.  According to his memoirs, the labour nearly cost him and his mother their lives, as Guibert was a breech birth.  Guibert's family made an offering to a shrine of the Virgin Mary, and promised that if Guibert survived, he would be dedicated to a clerical life.  Since he survived, he followed this path.  His father was violent, unfaithful and prone to excess, and was captured at the Battle of Mortemer, dying eight months later.  In his memoirs, Guibert views his death as a type of blessing, stating that if his father had survived, he likely would have forced Guibert to become a knight, thus breaking the oath to the Virgin Mary to dedicate Guibert to the church.  His mother was domineering, of great beauty and intelligence, and exceedingly zealous. Guibert writes so much about his mother, and in such detail, that some scholars, such as Archambault, have suggested that he may have had an Oedipus complex.  She assumed control of his education, isolated him from his peers and hired him a private tutor, from the ages of six to twelve. Guibert remembers the tutor as brutally exacting, and incompetent; nevertheless Guibert and his tutor developed a strong bond. When Guibert was around the age of twelve, his mother retired to an abbey near Saint-Germer-de-Fly (or Flay), and he soon followed.  Entering the Order at St. Germer, he studied with great zeal, devoting himself at first to the secular poets Ovid and Virgil—an experience which left its imprint on his works.  He later changed his focus to theology, through the influence of Anselm of Bec, who later became the Archbishop of Canterbury.

In 1104, he was chosen abbot of the poor and tiny abbey of Nogent-sous-Coucy (founded 1059) and henceforth took a more prominent part in ecclesiastical affairs, where he came into contact with bishops and court society. More importantly, it gave him time to engage in his passion for writing. His first major work of this period is his history of the First Crusade called Dei gesta per Francos (God's deeds through the Franks), finished in 1108 and touched up in 1121. The history is largely a paraphrase, in ornate style, of the Gesta Francorum of an anonymous Norman author; Crusade historians have traditionally not given it favourable reviews; the fact that he stays so close to Gesta Francorum, and the difficulty of his Latin, make it seem superfluous. Recent editors and translators, however, have called attention to his excellent writing and original material. More importantly, the Dei gesta supplies us with invaluable information about the reception of the crusade in France. Guibert personally knew crusaders, had grown up with crusaders, and talked with them about their memories and experiences.

For the modern reader, his autobiography (De vita sua sive monodiarum suarum libri tres), or Monodiae (Solitary Songs, commonly referred to as his Memoirs), written in 1115, is considered the most interesting of his works. Written towards the close of his life, and based on the model of the Confessions of Saint Augustine, he traces his life from his childhood to adulthood.  Throughout, he gives picturesque glimpses of his time and the customs of his country. The text is divided into three "Books."  The first covers his own life, from birth to adulthood; the second is a brief history of his monastery; the third is a description of an uprising in nearby Laon. He provides invaluable information on daily life in castles and monasteries, on the educational methods then in vogue, and gives insights into some of the major and minor personalities of his time. His work is coloured by his passions and prejudices, which add a personal touch to the work.

For example, he was quite skeptical about the propriety of Catholic relics of Jesus Christ, the Virgin Mary and numerous Catholic saints, and entertained doubts about their authenticity, noting that some shrines and pilgrimage sites made conflicting claims about which bodily remnants, clothing or other sacred objects were held at which site.

Notes

References
Sources
The Autobiography Of Guibert. C.C. Swinton Bland, translator,The Autobiography of Guibert, Abbot of Nogent-sous-Coucy (London: George Routledge: New York: E.P. Dutton, 1925) From Internet Archive
Excerpts from the English translation by C.C. Swinton Bland.
On the Saints and their Relics from the Internet Medieval Sourcebook
The Revolt in Laon from the Internet Medieval Sourcebook.
On the First Crusade, includes Guibert's version of Pope Urban's speech and impressions of Peter the Hermit.
The Deeds of God through the Franks, e-text from Project Gutenberg. Translated by Robert Levine 1997.
Books
Paul J. Archambault (1995). A Monk's Confession: The Memoirs of Guibert of Nogent. 
John Benton, ed. (1970). Self and Society in Medieval France: The Memoirs of Abbot Guibert of Nogent. A revised edition of the 1925 C.C. Swinton Bland edition, includes introduction and latest research.  (1984 reprint, University of Toronto Press).
Guibert of Nogent, Dei Gesta per Francos, ed. R.B.C. Huygens, Corpus Christianorum, Continuatio Mediaevalis 127A (Turnhout: Brepols, 1996)
Robert Levine (1997). The Deeds of God through the Franks : A Translation of Guibert de Nogent's `Gesta Dei per Francos' . 
Joseph McAlhany, Jay Rubenstein, eds. (2011). Monodies and On the Relics of Saints: the Autobiography and a Manifesto of a French Monk from the Time of the Crusades. Translated from the Latin, with introduction and notes. Penguin Classics. 
Jay Rubenstein (2002). Guibert of Nogent: Portrait of a Medieval Mind, London. .
 Karin Fuchs, Zeichen und Wunder bei Guibert de Nogent. Kommunikation, Deutungen und Funktionalisierungen von Wundererzählungen im 12. Jahrhundert (München: Oldenbourg, 2008) (Pariser Historische Studien, 84).
Laurence Terrier (2013). "La doctrine de l'eucharistie de Guibert de Nogent. De pigneribus Livre II. Texte et Traduction", Paris, Vrin. 
Articles
 Elizabeth Lapina, "Anti-Jewish rhetoric in Guibert of Nogent's Dei gesta per Francos," Journal of Medieval History, 35,3 (2009), 239-253.

External links
 
 

1124 deaths
Medieval writers about the Crusades
12th-century French writers
French religious writers
12th-century French historians
French autobiographers
French abbots
Benedictine abbots
Year of birth uncertain
French male writers
12th-century Latin writers